Echis omanensis, commonly known as the Oman saw-scaled viper, is a species of viper. Like all other vipers, it is  venomous.

Geographic range
The snake is found in eastern Oman and the United Arab Emirates. It is present from sea level up to an altitude of 1000 meters.

References

Reptiles described in 2004
Reptiles of the Arabian Peninsula
Viperinae